Stanley Owen Jones (1930–2012) was a Welsh watercolour artist who was inspired by the natural world and in particular by references to nature in Dylan Thomas' poetry; he often painted images of plant life, and the sun.

Early life and education
Jones grew up on a farm, called Werndew,
in Pembrokeshire. As a youth he went to school in what's now known as 'yr Hen Ysgol' in Dinas Cross and then Fishguard Grammar, where he was head boy. On laving Grammar School he did his National Service in the RAF

After teacher training college in Swansea, Stan Jones studied art at Trinity University College in Carmarthen (1950–1952) and then Cardiff School of Art & Design from 1957–58, where he was taught by Robert Hunter, and Esther Grainger. During his teaching career he took different courses in Art and design, amongst them a years Design and Photography course (from 1971 to 1972)  at Middlesex Polytechnic (now Middlesex University).

Career
Jones  early interest was in woodcuts and lino prints. Then he began painting with inspiration from Dylan Thomas' poetry and was inspired to paint over 100 watercolours using lines from the poetry such as ‘Happy as the grass was green’ and ‘Here were fond climates’. Jones was also inspired by the Sun and it is featured in many of his works of art. Many of his paintings also sought to capture forms of nature, particularly flowers and shrubs he saw around him.

His first teaching job was at Victoria Primary School, Penarth from 1952 to 1957 and then he became head of the Art and Design Department at St Cyres School in Penarth. He taught at the school for nearly 30 years (1959-1988). Jones was a very popular teacher and ex-pupils remember him fondly with comments such as: 'he was a lovely man, a great teacher and I loved being in his Art class.  'He encouraged me in my art when I felt I wasn't any good at it!'.

After retiring as Head of the Art and Design Department in 1987, Jones became  a part-time lecturer at South Glamorgan Institute of Higher Education from 1990 to 1998 and also tutored at the community centre in Penarth. He was Chairman of the Watercolour Society of Wales from 1973 to 1992 and had many exhibitions with that group. With this group he exhibited eleven times between 1957 and 1987 at the National Museum Wales.

Jones was also on the Executive Committee of the Contemporary Arts Society of Wales (CASW) and designed their logo in 2000. He exhibited with them too and was responsible for choosing art students that would receive a grant from them. He also wrote a book in Welsh called Tra'd yn y Tir about growing up on Werndew Farm in Dinas Cross, Pembrokeshire and illustrated it throughout with pen and ink drawings.

Jones was married in 1958 and had one daughter in 1959; his wife and daughter survive him. His wife Morfwyn Henry Jones, he described as his soulmate and she introduced him to the poetry of Dylan Thomas. From 1958 until his death Jones lived in Dinas Powys, South Wales.

Jones said of his own work:
I found much freedom in the lines of Dylan Thomas to interpret them in many different ways. I have always been interested in the cosmic-creation of the universe, the sun, the moon, stars, space and nature-things that never change and are always there. These are often referred to in Dylan Thomas' poetry
My other particular interest is with Celtic symbolism; I believe this may be due to my upbringing on a farm in Pembrokeshire where I was surrounded by relics of ancient history. Consequently, some of my works are based on Celtic Crosses and Cromlechs
Although most of the paintings are in watercolour, I find working in mixed media quite interesting and stimulating . In some cases, there is an element of the [printmaking] technique appearing. This mixing of media may be due to the teaching  of Art  and Design in a Comprehensive school.

Alun Williams, School Museum Officer in Art, National Museum of Wales, had this to say about  Jones:
"Stan Jones explores difficult artistic terrain. On one side he skirts the complex, sometimes impenetrable thickets of Anglo-Welsh verse, on the other he borders the enticing but treacherous domain of the painter's craft. His mission is to keep to the path, to tread the narrow way which divides yet joins them.  For him words create an image.  A phrase pruned from trailing anthology becomes a metaphor to be appraised visually. There can be no exactness in such translation. We judge them intuitively.
The routine tasks which expunge the secret impulses of personal creation in most of us are a source of strength to him, and his work as a teacher provides a link with freshness and youthful vigor. His preoccupations with Celtic symbolism, with open spaces and with flowers are conveyed with a consequent energy which is devoid of guile, accepting only the honest demands of his expressive needs, and of each picture, mysterious individual purpose"

Jones made several TV appearances including one on pottery for the BBC and various talking about his work as an artist. He also spoke on radio and was reviewed in papers such as the Western Mail

Selected exhibitions
A number of the artists sketches and paintings (76 in total) were acquired in 2014 the [National Library of Wales], Aberystwyth, known as the Bequest Collection. The curator of the [National Library of Wales], Lona Mason, said about this collection: 
"The National Library of Wales collects art of notable importance created by artists who have contributed significantly to art in Wales: it was therefore important that the Library acquired works by Stan Jones, not only are the works preserved for future generations, they are also available for people to explore and enjoy."

Stan Jones was a prolific artist and exhibited over 50 times in his life, many of these one man shows.  One man shows included an exhibition titled 'In the Beginning' and one called 'In my Intricate Image' (both poems by Dylan Thomas) in 1965 and 1966 at Thomson House, Cardiff; Haverfordwest Library 1972; Fishguard Library 1975; University College, Cardiff 1980; The Boat House, Laugharne, 1982; Sessions Gallery Newport West Wales 1985, 1994, 1998. He also had a one-man show in an exhibition called 'Welsh Artists Exhibiting in the United States of America' in Wenniger Gallery, Boston, USA in 1987, which was organised in conjunction with the Arts Council of Wales. Other exhibitions included : Turner House Gallery, Penarth, Fishguard Library (1975), Albany Gallery, Cardiff (1969), National Museum Wales (1957–1987, exhibited eleven times here). *Stan Jones: A Retrospective, at Oriel Washington Gallery in Penarth; ran from 4 – 25 July 2011.
His work appeared at the Howard Roberts Gallery in Cardiff in 1968 under the title Four Glamorgan Artists and then the Albany Gallery, Cardiff in 1969 with the title Welsh Landscapes.  He exhibited in a touring exhibition with the 'South Wales Group' between 1973 /74 which included the Glynn Vivian Art Gallery in Swansea and the City Art Gallery in Shrewsbury
Jones exhibited at the Royal National Eisteddfod of Wales seven times between 1963 and 1980. 
For a month in September 1995 Stan Jones exhibited in a joint exhibition of The Watercolour Society of Wales and the Royal Cambrian Academy at Turner House Gallery, Penarth; two lithographs at this exhibition were by HRH Prince Charles.
Along with other prestigious Welsh Artists, Stan Jones submitted a watercolour for a 'Art for Mercy' Auction and exhibition  in November 2002 at the Washington Gallery, Penarth.
As well as the National Library of Wales, collections of his work include Cardiff University,  the Arts Council of Wales, the local authorities of Cardiff, Glamorgan, Gwent, Walsall and Wiltshire. He has many works with private collectors including in Japan, America and Canada.

Gallery

References

External links
Post war and post modern artists. A Dictionary of Artists in Wales (2015). Edited by Peter W Jones and Isabel Hitchman. Published by Gomer Press, Ceredigion. . (The Artist is listed in this publication)
Stan Jones at Penarth’s Washington Gallery
Stan Jones: a retrospective of Dylan Thomas-inspired art

1930 births
2012 deaths
20th-century Welsh painters
20th-century British male artists
People from Pembrokeshire
Welsh male painters
20th-century Welsh male artists